Chamod Piumal (born 5 November 1995) is a Sri Lankan cricketer. He made his first-class debut for Sri Lanka Police Sports Club in Tier B of the 2017–18 Premier League Tournament on 28 December 2017. He made his Twenty20 debut for Sri Lanka Police Sports Club in the 2017–18 SLC Twenty20 Tournament on 1 March 2018. He made his List A debut for Sri Lanka Police Sports Club in the 2017–18 Premier Limited Overs Tournament on 12 March 2018.

References

External links
 

1995 births
Living people
Sri Lankan cricketers
Bloomfield Cricket and Athletic Club cricketers
Sri Lanka Police Sports Club cricketers
Place of birth missing (living people)